Dobrinovo may refer to:
in Bulgarian (the name is written Добриново) :
Dobrinovo, Burgas Province, a village in the Karnobat Municipality
Dobrinovo, Kardzhali Province, a village in the Kardzhali Municipality